USS Savannah may refer to:

 was a 1-gun galley built in 1799
 was a sailing frigate launched in 1842
 was a submarine tender in service during World War I
 was a light cruiser in service during World War II
 was a fleet replenishment oiler in service from 1970 to 1995
 is an  constructed in Mobile, Alabama, at Austal USA.  First cut was made 19 July 2018.

See also

United States Navy ship names